The following is a list of on-demand music streaming services. These services offer streaming of full-length content via the Internet as a part of their service, without the listener necessarily having to purchase a file for download. This type of service is somewhat similar to Internet radio. Many of these sites have advertising and offer non-free options in the style of a digital music store.

For a list of online music stores that provide a means of purchasing and downloading music as files of some sort, see comparison of digital music stores. Many sites from both of these categories offer services similar to an online music database.

Current services

Discontinued services

See also

Comparison of digital music stores
Comparison of online music lockers
List of music software
List of Internet radio stations
List of online music databases

Notes

Regional availability

Platforms

References

Music
Music streaming